Maria da Luz Guebuza, is an advocate of HIV and was the First Lady of Mozambique during President Armando Guebuza her husband in February 2005 until January 2015.

Guebuza, an advocate who patronize issue addressing orphaned and HIV/AIDS, launched the Unite For Children and Unite Against AIDS, a forum under the UN Initiative. She was the vice chair Lady African Synergy.

She is the patron of Global Plan under the UNAIDS since 2015.

References

External links 

 
 
 
 
 
 

Living people
First ladies of Mozambique
1960 births